Noriko Ogawa may refer to:

 Noriko Ogawa (pianist) , born 1962, classical musician
 Noriko Ogawa (singer) , born 1973, singer and actress
 Noriko Ishigaki (born Noriko Ogawa , 1974), a politician